Ryan Allen (born February 28, 1990) is an American football punter who is a free agent. He played college football for the Louisiana Tech University. Allen won the 2011 and 2012 Ray Guy Awards and was a consensus All-American in 2012. He was signed by the New England Patriots as an undrafted free agent in 2013.

High school career
Allen attended West Salem High School in Salem, Oregon, where he played on the football team for two years as a punter/kicker. In 2007, he was named to the all-state first team.

College career
In 2008, Allen walked on at Oregon State along with fellow punter Johnny Hekker. As a freshman, he was redshirted. He did not play in 2009 as he remained behind Hekker on the team's depth chart. He then went to Louisiana Tech, and in 2010, he played in 12 games, averaging 40.8 yards on 60 punts. He had 21 punts go inside the 20-yard line. Four of his punts went over 50 yards, including a season-long punt of 66 yards.

In 2011, Allen punted 83 times and set a school record with a 46.3 yard average per punt. He ranked first in the nation with 39 punts inside the 20 yard line, and he had a season-long punt of 72 yards against Mississippi State. In the Poinsettia Bowl, he averaged 43.2 yards on five punts. Allen was named to the All-WAC first team and won the Ray Guy Award as the best college football punter.

Allen averaged 48.0 yards on 45 punts as a senior in 2012. He had 21 punts that were longer than 50 yards and 20 punts that were downed inside the 20 yard line. Allen had a career-long 85-yard punt against New Mexico State. He led the NCAA in punting yards per punt, was a unanimous All-American, and won the Ray Guy Award for the second time, the first punter to ever win back-to-back Ray Guy Awards.

Professional career

New England Patriots
Two punters—Jeff Locke and Sam Martin—were selected in the 2013 NFL Draft; Allen was not. He signed a standard three-year contract as an undrafted free agent with the New England Patriots on April 27, 2013. During training camp, Allen beat out veteran Zoltán Meskó, who was released at the final roster cutdown.

Allen was named the Week 14 AFC Special Teams Player of the Week for his contributions to the Patriots win over San Diego Chargers. In Super Bowl XLIX, he punted four times for 196 yards and set a then Super Bowl record with a 64-yard punt, helping the Patriots to a 28–24 victory over the Seattle Seahawks. On July 25, 2015, the Patriots signed Allen to a three-year contract extension; the NFL's Collective Bargaining Agreement allows undrafted rookies to sign extensions after two seasons. The new deal, which ran through the 2018 season, had $6.1 million in new money, including a $2 million signing bonus and $1 million in guaranteed salary in 2016.

In 2016, Allen was praised for his performance in the Patriots' Week 3 win, 27–0, over the Houston Texans. He punted seven times, averaging over 49 yards per punt; none of his punts were returned, and all of them left the Texans starting at or behind their own 20-yard line. His performance earned him AFC Special Teams Player of the Week honors. On February 5, 2017, Allen was part of the Patriots team that won Super Bowl LI. In the game, Allen punted four times for 166 yards as the Patriots defeated the Atlanta Falcons by a score of 34–28 in overtime. Allen made his third Super Bowl appearance the next season for the Patriots in Super Bowl LII; however, the Patriots lost to the Philadelphia Eagles 41–33, and Allen never punted during the game. The next year, his former college teammate Johnny Hekker broke his Super Bowl record for the Los Angeles Rams, though the Patriots would win that game and give Allen his third Super Bowl championship.

On March 22, 2019, Allen re-signed with the Patriots on a one-year deal. However, on August 19, 2019, he was released in favor of rookie Jake Bailey who was drafted by the Patriots in the fifth round of the 2019 NFL Draft.

Atlanta Falcons
On November 4, 2019, Allen signed with the Atlanta Falcons, making him the team's fifth Punter of the season. He was released on November 29, 2019, when Matt Bosher was activated off injured reserve. He was re-signed again on December 7, 2019, following an injury to Bosher. Despite playing only half a season in 2019, and having a career low in yards per punt, Allen had arguably his most accurate season in the NFL, pinning exactly half of his punts (14 out of 28) inside the 20.

On February 18, 2020, Allen signed a one-year contract extension with the Falcons. On August 2, 2020, Allen was released by the Falcons.

Tennessee Titans
On November 7, 2020, Allen was signed by the Tennessee Titans. He was waived on November 17, and signed to the team's practice squad two days later. He was released from the practice squad on November 24, 2020.

Indianapolis Colts
On December 3, 2020, Allen signed with the practice squad of the Indianapolis Colts. He was elevated to the active roster on December 5 and December 12 for the team's weeks 13 and 14 games against the Houston Texans and Las Vegas Raiders, and reverted to the practice squad after each game. He was released on December 21.

NFL career statistics

Personal life
Allen was born in Salem, Oregon, on February 28, 1990. His parents are Mike and Sherry Allen, and he has one sister, Jessica. He was a business major at Louisiana Tech.

References

External links
New England Patriots profile

1990 births
Living people
All-American college football players
American football punters
Atlanta Falcons players
Indianapolis Colts players
Louisiana Tech Bulldogs football players
New England Patriots players
Oregon State Beavers football players
Players of American football from Oregon
Sportspeople from Salem, Oregon
Tennessee Titans players